Vincenzina "Vini" Ciccarello (born 1947) is a former Australian Labor Party MP for the electoral district of Norwood in South Australia. She was also the mayor of the City of Kensington and Norwood for seven years.

Ciccarello first won the seat of Norwood at the 1997 election. She retained the seat at the 2002 and 2006 election, but lost the seat at the 2010 election to Liberal Party candidate Steven Marshall.

She was appointed as a member of the Libraries Board of South Australia in 2012.

Ciccarello stood for local government election in the City of Norwood Payneham & St Peters in 2018 but was not elected.

References

External links
 Poll Bludger article
 

1947 births
Living people
Australian people of Italian descent
Mayors of places in South Australia
Members of the South Australian House of Assembly
Australian Labor Party members of the Parliament of South Australia
21st-century Australian politicians
21st-century Australian women politicians
Women members of the South Australian House of Assembly
Women mayors of places in South Australia